Göran Folkestad (born 1952) is a Swedish songwriter and singer. He is professor of music pedagogy at Malmö Academy of Music. He has competed three times in Melodifestivalen during the 1980s, with the songs:

1984: "Sankta Cecilia" 2nd (duet with Lotta Engberg, under the surname of Pedersen.
1985: "Eld och lågor" 3rd
1987: "Sommarnatt", unplaced (The song was sung by Robert Wells)

Discography

Albums

Singles

References 

1952 births
Living people
Swedish male singers
Swedish songwriters
Academic staff of Lund University
Singers from Stockholm
Melodifestivalen contestants of 1985